The men's 10,000 metres in speed skating at the 1980 Winter Olympics took place on 23 February, at the James B. Sheffield Olympic Skating Rink.

Records
Prior to this competition, the existing world and Olympic records were as follows:

The following new Olympic and World records was set during the competition.

Results

References

Men's speed skating at the 1980 Winter Olympics